Algerian couscous, (Berber languages: ⵙⴽⵙⵓ, romanized: seksu, Arabic: كُسْكُس kuskus) – sometimes called kusksi, kseksu, or seksu, is a North African dish that typically consists of semolina granules. There are several regional variations of Algerian couscous, and the specific ingredients and preparation methods can vary depending on the area and the preferences of the cook.

The preparation of Algerian couscous can be a time-consuming process that requires several steps. First, the semolina granules are moistened with water and olive oil and rubbed together until they form small, uniform balls. These balls are then steamed in a keskas, a special pot with a steamer basket on top, for about an hour until they are fluffy and tender. Meanwhile, the meat and vegetables are cooked in a separate pot with spices, such as cumin, coriander, and turmeric. The stew is then combined with the cooked couscous,  and the dish is typically garnished with onions or fresh herbs, such as parsley or cilantro.

Algerian couscous dishes 
Although there is some debate about the precise number of couscous dishes in Algeria, with estimates ranging from 300 to 1000 different varieties, it is widely accepted that the country boasts an extensive array of couscous variations, which serve as a testament to the diversity and opulence of Algerian culture and cuisine.

Some of the most common variations of Algerian couscous include:

 Couscous Algérois: This is a popular type of couscous in Algiers, the capital city of Algeria. It typically features lamb or beef stewed with chickpeas, onions, carrots, squash and a variety of spices.
 Vegetable couscous: This couscous dish features a medley of nutritious vegetables including potatoes, carrots, green beans, squash, onions, tomatoes, turnips, and optionally, eggplants. It may be prepared with either chicken or beef, or as a vegetarian option. Accompanied by chickpeas and fresh spring onions on the side. To achieve a clear broth instead of a red one, saffron, paprika, tomatoes, and tomato puree should be omitted.
 Fish couscous: This couscous is popular in the city of Jijel and often features fish, such as sea bass or red snapper, as well as tomatoes, and bell peppers.
 Kabyle couscous: This couscous dish, locally called Seksou, involves preparing meat, onions, and tomato-based sauce in a couscous pot. The meat is cut into pieces and arranged in the pot, while a sliced onion is added to it. A tomato-based sauce is then added, which can be made by either grinding tomatoes or diluting tomato concentrate in water. Along with this, oil, black pepper, red pepper, cinnamon, and salt are added as per taste. Chicken or meat can be used to prepare this dish.
 Royal couscous: This dish that features merguez sausages as the main protein source. These sausages are a staple of Algerian cuisine and are served on top of the couscous along with vegetables. The bold and spicy flavor of the sausages complements the nutty taste of the couscous and the fragrant spices used in the vegetable broth. Merguez couscous is a popular dish in France, enjoyed not only by the Algerian immigrants but also by the local population.
 Chicken couscous: It features a flavorful stew made with tender chicken and hearty chickpeas. This savory dish is often paired with a creamy white sauce to enhance its richness and bring out its delicious flavors.
 Couscous bel'foul: A type of couscous called Aghmoud in the Amazigh-speaking regions, made with beans and olive oil. Very popular small villages in the Kabylia region.
 Mesfouf Qsentena or sweet date couscous: This sweet couscous dish is achieved without any added sugar. The subtle sweetness is derived solely from the addition of succulent, golden and honeyed dates, which have come to symbolize the great Algerian Sahara, particularly the Degla and Deglet Nour varieties.
 Ouchchou tinni or vegetable and date couscous: Similar to the previously mentioned couscous dish, but this one strikes a perfect balance between savory and sweet flavors. It differs in that it incorporates the use of tomatoes, carrots, and onions and spices.
 Mesfouf b'l-djelbana: is a specific type of mesfouf that is made with green peas, after cooking the peas, they are poured over the couscous, butter is added, and everything is mixed thoroughly. The dish is served hot, and accompanied with whey or fermented milk. For those who prefer a sweeter flavor, a small amount of sugar can be added to the dish along with the butter. Similarly, tender beans cut into small pieces or a combination of mixed peas and beans can be used in place of the peas. 
 Kesksou m'ammer: Stuffed chicken couscous is a dish that typically consists of seasoned chicken breasts that are stuffed with a flavorful filling and then served alongside a bed of fluffy couscous. The filling can vary depending on the recipe, but it may include ingredients such as vegetables, cheese, nuts, or herbs.
 Rfiss zirawi Sweet walnut couscous: Ziraoui is a dessert that is made from couscous, butter, honey, cinnamon, and anise seeds. The mixture is then shaped into a round or oval shape, and decorated with toasted sesame seeds, walnuts or almonds.
 Seffa b'djedj or sweet chicken couscous: It is a type of seffa that includes chicken as a main ingredient. The dish is made by cooking chicken in a flavorful broth with spices such as ginger, saffron, and cinnamon. The cooked chicken is then shredded and mixed with steamed couscous and garnished with a sweet mixture of raisins, almonds, cinnamon, and powdered sugar.
 Mesfouf / seffa b'z-zbib or sweet couscous with raisins: A sweet Algerian couscous variation made with steamed semolina grains, raisins, and spices such as cinnamon. It is often served as a dessert or snack, and can be customized with different toppings.
 Kesksou b'l- cosbâne or T'aam belbekbouka: It consists of a whole lamb or goat's stomach that is stuffed with a mixture of spicy couscous, meat, smen and vegetables, and then cooked until tender. The dish is typically served during special occasions and celebrations.
 T'aam b'l-hchim or dried meat couscous: a type of couscous dish that is made with dried meat as a main ingredient.
 T'aâm b'l-khlî or confit meat couscous: Confit meat couscous is a type of couscous dish that features meat that has been cooked using the confit method. Confit is a French term that refers to a method of cooking meat in fat at a low temperature, which results in tender, flavorful meat.
 Couscous with milk: The process involves peeling and cutting squash into small pieces, cooking it in broth until it melts, adding milk, and then basting couscous with the mixture. The couscous is then arranged with the cooked squash and beans, and left to rest before serving.

References 

Algerian cuisine
Arab cuisine
African cuisine
Maghrebi cuisine
Mediterranean cuisine